Baron Carlo Amato (August 29, 1938 – October 20, 2021) was an Italian-born aristocrat and businessman who was perhaps most famed for his summer home, Shangri- La, in Nova Scotia being the point of origination of pasta primavera. He was also known as a prominent real estate investor including his large role in the development of the small Caribbean Island of Canouan which is part of the nation of St. Vincent and the Grenadines. Baron Amato was the former Ambassador of The Sovereign Military Hospitaller Order of Saint John of Jerusalem of Rhodes and of Malta to the countries of St. Vincent and the Grenadines and St. Lucia.

References

External links
Pasta Primavera - 
 Amato in Canouan - 

Italian businesspeople
1938 births
2021 deaths
Place of birth missing